The Women's 150 metre individual medley SM4 swimming events for the 2020 Summer Paralympics took place at the Tokyo Aquatics Centre on 28 August 2021.

Medal summary
The following is a summary of the medals awarded across the 150 metre individual medley events.

SM4
The SM4 category is for swimmers who have hemiplegia, paraplegia or short stature.

Heats
The swimmers with the top eight times, regardless of heat, advanced to the final.

Final

References

Swimming at the 2020 Summer Paralympics